Sally McCarthy Bolster is a former member of the Connecticut House of Representatives, representing the 137th District from 1988 to 1993. She has served for many years on the Norwalk Common Council, including as its president. She had previously been an aide to U.S. Representative Stewart McKinney.

Political career 
In 1974, she was a candidate for Secretary of the State of Connecticut.

In 1988, she defeated Democratic challenger Heather Rodin in a special election to fill the Connecticut House seat vacated by Frank Esposito.

In 1990, she defeated Democratic challenger Herbert Feuerhake.

In 1992, Bolster's residence was redistricted into a newly formed 141st district with part of Darien. She ran against incumbent Reginald L. Jones, Jr. as a Democrat but was defeated.

References 

Connecticut city council members
Connecticut Democrats
Connecticut Republicans
Members of the Connecticut House of Representatives
Politicians from Norwalk, Connecticut
Living people
Women state legislators in Connecticut
Women city councillors in Connecticut
Year of birth missing (living people)
21st-century American women